Lars Sigmundstad (born 29 August 1943) is a Norwegian politician for the Centre Party.

He served as a deputy representative to the Norwegian Parliament from Rogaland during the terms 1969–1973 and 1973–1977. In total he met during 5 days of parliamentary session.

References

1943 births
Living people
Deputy members of the Storting
Centre Party (Norway) politicians
Rogaland politicians
Place of birth missing (living people)
20th-century Norwegian politicians